Mafoune is a small town and commune in the Cercle of Tominian in the Ségou Region of Mali. As of 1998 the commune had a population of 16,141.
It lies near the border with Burkina Faso.The main ethnical groups of the Mafoune commune: Bwa (Bobo oule and Bobofing), Fulani, Minianka, Dogon, Bambara...
Some villages of the commune are: Mafoune, Sira, Kira, Wanian, Zogoue, Wara, Lohan, Lakuy, Makoina, Lebekuy, Panani, Bourelo,Bokuy (Mankoina),Bokuy (Lohan),Mandoulo,Kian,Mouni...

References

Communes of Ségou Region